Rachel Jane "Jennie" Nicol (1845–1881) was a founder of Pi Beta Phi and a physician. In 1867, she co-founded I.C. Sorosis at Monmouth College in Illinois, the first secret collegiate society for women patterned after men’s fraternities, which later adopted the Greek name Pi Beta Phi (ΠΒΦ). Pi Beta Phi is now an international organization with over 300,000 members. At a time when there were only a few hundred women physicians in the United States she received her M.D. degree in 1879.

Biography 
She was the second child, and the only daughter, among four children born to a Presbyterian farming couple from Ohio who emigrated to Edgington, Illinois (where she was born) and later moved to the village of Little York, Illinois. Her father died in 1861. Her older brother, Drennan, drowned in the Mississippi river and her youngest brother David died in Tennessee on August 20, 1864 in the American Civil War. Her brother William would survive into old age.

In 1864 Nicol enrolled in the Scientific Program at Monmouth College (Illinois) graduating in 1868. In her Junior year (third year) she cofounded the first women's fraternity I.C. Sorosis, later to become Pi Beta Phi.

She continued her education at Woman’s Medical College of Pennsylvania and graduated with an M.D. degree in 1879. She then interned for a year at New England Hospital for Women and Children in Boston.

In 1880, she sailed to Switzerland via Holland and Germany where she enrolled in the University of Zurich, and "attended two lectures daily and the remainder of the time devoting to the clinics and the hospitals; am also having practice work in the pathological laboratory…" There she died an untimely death three months later from meningitis following a bout of pneumonia.

In her honor, Pi Beta Phi, the sorority she helped found, built and supplied the Jennie Nicol Memorial Health Center that operated in Gatlinburg, Tennessee, from 1922 until 1965.

Her body was shipped (via rail and ship) to her family home in Little York where she was buried in the churchyard of Cedar Creek Presbyterian Church.

References 

1845 births
1881 deaths
Monmouth College alumni
Pi Beta Phi
American women physicians